Expressway S6 (in Polish droga ekspresowa S6) is a major road in Poland which has been planned to run from the A6 autostrada in Szczecin, through Goleniów in West Pomerania to Gdańsk parallel to the Baltic coast, forming the main connection between Gdańsk and Szczecin. 

The next part of  S6 to be opened was   bypass of Słupsk that was completed in October 2010. The bypass of Nowogard was completed in December 2011, with the rest of the section between Szczecin and Koszalin open by 2019.

In July 2010, the route between  Goleniów and Słupsk was finalised. The road will be a dual carriageway, with 27 interchanges and 130 viaducts, with about 20% of it overlapping the current route of National Road 6 (DK6). Doubts about financing made construction not expected to start before 2020, but the schedule was later accelerated. The tenders for design-build contracts on the section between Goleniów and Koszalin were announced in August 2014, with expected completion around 2018. The exact route of S6 between Słupsk and Gdańsk has not yet been determined.   

Though the road was meant to be finished in 2018, it still is not how it was planned, as of 2022. The whole S6 route is passable, but some parts (Between Gdańsk and Kolobrzeg) are smaller than how the S6 was planned. With only one lane on each side and showing the unfinished parts of infrastructure, the S6 seems more like a Droga Wojewodzka, not a Droga krajowa or a Droga ekspresowa.   

After World War I, the German HaFraBa association had already set up plans to build an Autobahn along the route from Berlin through the Polish Corridor, to the Free City of Danzig and East Prussia (today informally known as Berlinka). The construction was pushed by the Nazi authorities after 1933 as an extraterritorial  Reichsautobahn across the Polish Corridor of prewar Poland further south than the modern S6 freeway has been planned for, but the road was never completed.

Sections of the expressway

References

See also
A6 autostrada (Poland)
Highways in Poland

Expressways in Poland
Proposed roads in Poland